Iceland is a Nordic island country in the North Atlantic Ocean. The capital and largest city is Reykjavík. Reykjavík and the surrounding areas in the southwest of the country are home to over two-thirds of the population. Iceland is volcanically and geologically active. 

Iceland has a market economy with relatively low taxes compared to other OECD countries. It maintains a Nordic social welfare system that provides universal health care and tertiary education for its citizens. Iceland ranks high in economic, political and social stability and equality. In 2013, it was ranked as the 13th most-developed country in the world by the United Nations' Human Development Index. Iceland runs almost completely on renewable energy. Affected by the ongoing worldwide financial crisis, the nation's entire banking system systemically failed in October 2008, leading to a severe depression, substantial political unrest, the Icesave dispute, and the institution of capital controls. Many bankers were jailed, and the economy has made a significant recovery, in large part due to a surge in tourism.

As of 2011, there are approximately 32,500 companies registered in Iceland of which 14,500 (45%) are active.

Notable firms 
This list includes notable companies with primary headquarters located in the country. The industry and sector follow the Industry Classification Benchmark taxonomy. Organizations which have ceased operations are included and noted as defunct.

See also 

 Economy of Iceland
 List of Icelandic brands
 List of restaurants in Iceland

References 

Iceland